Carrier Air Wing Seventeen (CVW-17), is a United States Navy aircraft carrier air wing based at Naval Air Station Lemoore, California. The air wing is attached to the aircraft carrier .

Mission
To conduct carrier air warfare operations and assist in the planning, control, coordination and integration of eight air wing squadrons and one detachment in support of carrier air warfare including; Interception and destruction of enemy aircraft and missiles in all-weather conditions to establish and maintain local air superiority. All-weather offensive air-to-surface attacks, Detection, localization, and destruction of enemy ships and submarines to establish and maintain local sea control. Aerial photographic, sighting, and electronic intelligence for naval and joint operations. Airborne early warning service to fleet forces and shore warning nets. Airborne electronic countermeasures. In-flight refueling operations to extend the range and the endurance of air wing aircraft and Search and rescue operations.

Subordinate units

CVW-17 consists of eight squadrons and one detachment:

History

1960s
Although an Atlantic Fleet carrier, Forrestals first deployment with CVW-17 was to Vietnam, from June to September 1967. After only four days on the line with 150 sorties flown, a Zuni rocket was accidentally fired on the flight deck on the morning of 29 July 1967. It hit the fueled and armed aircraft. In the resulting fire 134 crewmembers were killed and 161 injured. 21 aircraft were destroyed and 40 were damaged.

1970s
After a refit, Forrestal made eleven deployments to the Mediterranean Sea with CVW-17, the last in 1982. In 1974, CVW-17 guarded the evacuation of U.S. citizens during the Turkish invasion of Cyprus. In 1976, the U.S. President Gerald R. Ford commenced the celebrations of the United States Bicentennial aboard Forrestal.

On 15 January 1978 Forrestal was operating 60 km off the Florida coastline, when an LTV A-7 Corsair II from VA-81 crashed during landing. The aircraft hit another A-7 and a Grumman EA-6 Prowler. Two crewmen were killed, 10 were wounded. In March 1981, CVW-17 was in the Mediterranean Sea, when two F-14A Tomcat fighters from Nimitz shot down two Libyan fighters.

1980–1999
On 10 October 1985 F-14A Tomcats of VF-74 Be-Devilers and VF-103 Sluggers intercepted a Boeing 737 carrying terrorists, who had hijacked the Italian ocean liner . The fighters forced the Boeing 737 to land at Naval Air Station Sigonella, Italy. In April 1986, aircraft of CVW-17 participated in Operation El Dorado Canyon, the bombing of Libya. In 1991, CVW-17 was taking part in Operation Desert Storm, flying missions for 43 consecutive days. CVW-17's aircraft dropped 1,800 tons of ordnance, but lost an F/A-18C Hornet from VFA-81, a F-14A Tomcat from VF-103, and an A-6E Intruder from VA-35. During Operations Desert Shield and Desert Storm, CVW-17 comprised the following squadrons:
VAQ-132 Scorpions, VF-74 Be-Devilers, VF-103 Sluggers, HS-3 Tridents, VFA-81 Sunliners, VFA-83 Rampagers, VS-30 Diamondcutters, VAW-125 Tigertails, and VA-35 Black Panthers.

In 1992, the Wing's aircraft took part in Operation Deny Flight and Operation Provide Promise in Yugoslavia, and in Operation Southern Watch over Iraq.

The following September, CVW-17 moved its headquarters to NAS Oceana, Virginia. Due to the BRAC closure of NAS Cecil Field.

In 1998 CVW-17 was deployed to the Mediterranean Sea aboard . Starting in 2000, the Wing then made four deployments (2000, 2001, 2002 and 2006) aboard . Only in 2004, CVW-17 joined  for her final deployment before her decommissioning.

2000 – present
In 2004, aircraft from the air wing played key roles in supporting ground forces during the Iraq War, especially the operations in Fallujah, that began 7 November. CVW-17 joined USAF and United States Marine Corps (USMC) aircraft in striking key positions. During the height of operations, CVW-17 aircraft flew an average of 38 missions a day in support of ground troops. Together, the squadrons of CVW-17 flew 8,296 sorties for a total flight time of 21,824 hours. Of that total, 4,396 sorties and 11,607 flight hours were in direct support of Operation Iraqi Freedom. In all, CVW-17 dropped  of ordnance. During these operations, VFA-34 dropped the U.S. Navy's first two  Joint Direct Attack Munitions over Iraq.

In 2008, CVW-17 accompanied George Washington from Norfolk, Virginia to San Diego, California, although all fighter squadrons came from CVW-7, these keeping their "AG" tail code.

From January to April 2010, Carl Vinson operated off Haiti, following the 2010 Haiti earthquake. CVW-17 mainly consisted of detachments of six helicopter squadrons which were active in humanitarian relief operations. CVW-17 began its first regular deployment on Carl Vinson to the Western Pacific and the Indian Ocean on 30 November 2010 and returned on 15 June 2011. CVW-17 completed a second deployment on Carl Vinson from November 2011 to May 2012.  In October 2012, CVW-17 completed a home port change from NAS Oceana, VA to NAS Lemoore, California.

On 22 August 2014, Carl Vinson and CVW-17 began a scheduled deployment to the U.S. 5th and 7th Fleet areas of responsibility.

On 11 September 2014 at 17:40 hrs local time, two F/A-18Cs from CVW-17 crashed in the western Pacific Ocean whilst Carl Vinson was in her area of operations in the Indo-Asia-Pacific region. The planes where attached to Strike Squadron 94 and Strike Fighter Squadron 113 and collided 7 miles from the carrier, an area approximately 290 miles west of Wake Island. Whilst one pilot was recovered alive soon after the crash, the second pilot could not be located. The Navy continued its search for the second pilot until 13 September 2014, when the search was abandoned.

Carl Vinson returned to San Diego on 6 June 2015. Over the course of the deployment, supporting strike operations in Iraq and Syria, CVW-17 successfully flew 12,300 sorties, including 2,382 combat missions and dropped more than half a million pounds (230 tons) of ordnance against ISIS.

Current force

Fixed-wing aircraft
F/A-18E/F Super Hornet
F/A-18C Hornet
EA-18G Growler
E-2C Hawkeye
C-2A Greyhound

Rotary wing aircraft
MH-60S Knighthawk
MH-60R Seahawk

Carrier Air Group 17

There were two Carrier Air Groups designated Carrier Air Group SEVENTEEN (CVG-17).  Neither group shares a lineage with CVW-17 as the first was the forerunner of CVW-6 and the second was disestablished eight years before CVW-17 was established.

See also
 List of United States Navy Carrier air wings
 Carrier Strike Group One
 List of United States Navy aircraft wings
 Carrier Air Group SEVENTEEN

References

 CVW-14
Carrier Strike Group One
Military units and formations in Virginia
Military units and formations of the United States in the Gulf War
Lemoore, California